John St Loe Strachey (9 February 1860 – 26 August 1927), was a British journalist and newspaper proprietor.

Life
Strachey was the second son of Sir Edward Strachey, 3rd Baronet, and his wife Mary Isabella (née Symonds), and the brother of Edward Strachey, 1st Baron Strachie, and Henry Strachey. He was educated at Eton College and Balliol College, Oxford, and later called to the Bar, but chose to take up journalism as his profession. Between 1887 and 1925, he was editor of The Spectator. He was a close friend and confidant of the diplomat, Sir Cecil Spring Rice, with whom he corresponded for many years.

Strachey also edited (1896–1897) The Cornhill Magazine.

Strachey's son John became a Labour politician and government minister.

His daughter Amabel married the architect Clough Williams-Ellis.

Publications 
 The Adventure of Living : a Subjective Autobiography,

See also
Strachey Baronets

References

External links 
 
 
Parliamentary Archives, Papers of John St Loe Strachey (1860-1927)

1860 births
1927 deaths
People educated at Eton College
Alumni of Balliol College, Oxford
British male journalists
Younger sons of baronets
John (journalist)
People of the Victorian era
Deputy Lieutenants of Surrey